Lutescens or lutescans (Latin for "marshy, living in the marshes", from lutum "marsh, swamp, mud") may refer to:

Caiman lutescens, a fossil species of caiman. 
Dypsis lutescens, a palm
Pitcairnia lutescens, a species of bromeliads
Craterellus lutescens, a mushroom
Helix lutescens, a snail
Aloeides lutescens, a butterfly
Thalassoma lutescens, a fish
Ellobius lutescens, a rodent
Lutescens, a variety of wheat cultivated in Eastern Europe, see Taxonomy of wheat
Tremella lutescens, a formerly recognized species of fungus, see Tremella mesenterica
anglicized "lutescan" used once of the Mysian language (Titchener, J.B. 1926, "Synopsis of Greek and Roman Civilization", Cambridge MA)